Sparse may refer to:
Sparse, a software static analysis tool
Sparse language, a type of formal language in computational complexity theory
Sparse matrix, in numerical analysis, a matrix populated primarily with zeros
Sparse file, a computer file mostly empty
Sparse network, a network with many fewer connections than possible

See also